Oleg is a 2019 Latvian drama film directed by Juris Kursietis. It was screened in the Directors' Fortnight section at the 2019 Cannes Film Festival.

Plot
Oleg (Oļegs) is a non-citizen of Latvia of Russian origin and a butcher by profession, who searches for a better life by working in a Belgian meat factory. However, his status makes it difficult to make a profit, and after he loses his job, Oleg becomes dependent on migrant workers, who are a part of the local Polish mafia. When the seemingly lowest point in his life has been reached, he finds enough strength to bounce back and forces himself to make a decision to flee, which at first seems impossible. The story is reportedly based on real events.

Cast
 Valentin Novopolskij as Oleg
 Dawid Ogrodnik as Andrzej
 Anna Próchniak as Malgosia

Accolades
Oleg won the Grand Prix, National Competition, at the 2019 Brussels International Film Festival (BRIFF).

References

External links
 

2019 films
2019 drama films
Latvian drama films
Latvian-language films